Podcast Capture was introduced with Mac OS X 10.5 (Leopard), and allows users to record and distribute podcasts.  The software requires a connection to a computer running Mac OS X Server with Podcast Producer.

Users can record input from a local or remote audio or video device, capture screen activity, or choose an existing file to upload and distribute.

References

MacOS